Full Body Massage is a 1995 American erotic film directed by Nicolas Roeg. It stars Mimi Rogers getting a nude full body massage while talking about relationships and philosophy with her masseur (Bryan Brown).

Plot
Nina, an art dealer, has her weekly massage appointment and is surprised to find out her usual masseur, Douglas, has sent a replacement named Fitch.

The pair develop an easy rapport during the session, with talk about past relationships. As Nina lies fully nude on the massage table, Fitch also takes time to explain various massage techniques, including those used by Hopi medicine men.

Cast
 Mimi Rogers as Nina
 Bryan Brown as Fitch
 Christopher Burgard as Douglas
 Elizabeth Barondes as Alice
 Gareth Williams as Harry Willis
 Patrick Neil Quinn as Andy
 Heather Gunn as DeeDee
 Gabriella Hall as Young Nina (as Laura Saldivar)
 Brian McLane as Young Fitch
 William Fuller as Fitch's father
 Lynette Bennett as Fitch's Mother
 Rachel Nolin as Fitch's sister
 Michael Edmonds as Hopi medicine man
 Ross McKerras as Rancher
 Michael Robert Nyman as Rancher 2

Production
Mimi Rogers said Nicolas Roeg waited for her to have her baby so they shot four-and-a-half months after she gave birth. "My body was not what it usually is," she said.

Reception
The film has been ironically called an American version of the French film La Belle Noiseuse, which starred Emmanuelle Béart as an artist's model who spends much of the 240-minute feature nude, discussing relationships with the artist.

References

External links
 

1995 television films
1995 films
1990s English-language films
American television films
1995 drama films
Films directed by Nicolas Roeg
Films scored by Harry Gregson-Williams